Micropalaeosoma balticus (formerly Palaeosoma balticus) is an extinct, fossil turbellarian flatworm known from Baltic amber of Kaliningrad, Russia, that lived approximately 40 million years ago. It measured approximately 1.5 mm in length and is the oldest and most complete flatworm fossil yet discovered.

References

Prehistoric protostome genera
Turbellaria genera
Fossil taxa described in 2003
Fossils of Russia
Baltic amber
Taxa named by George Poinar Jr.